L. cornutus may refer to:
 Larinioides cornutus, an orb-weaver spider species
 Luxilus cornutus, the common shiner, a fish species

See also
 Cornutus (disambiguation)